Kim Jong-hui (born 6 June 1980) is a North Korean speed skater. She competed in two events at the 1998 Winter Olympics.

References

1980 births
Living people
North Korean female speed skaters
Olympic speed skaters of North Korea
Speed skaters at the 1998 Winter Olympics
Place of birth missing (living people)